The 1991–92 Eliteserien season was the 53rd season of ice hockey in Norway. Ten teams participated in the league, and Valerenga Ishockey won the championship.

Grunnserien

Eliteserien

Playoff Qualification

Group A

Group B

Playoffs

External links
Season on hockeyarchives.info

Nor
1991-92
GET